Majornas IK is a Swedish sport club from Gothenburg founded in 1916. The club is most famous for its handball team, who have been Swedish champions 7 times (1935, 1940, 1942, 1943, 1944, 1945 and 1946). Until 1964 they had played all seasons but one in the top flight, but have not played there since. They currently play in Division 4, the 6th level.

When the club started, it was mainly concentrated on association football, but the football section was discontinued in 2006 because of a lack of players. In 1928, the club took part in the creation of the Gothenburg district federation for bandy.

References 

Swedish handball clubs
Sports clubs in Gothenburg
1916 establishments in Sweden
Association football clubs established in 1916
Bandy clubs established in 1916
Handball clubs established in 1916
Multi-sport clubs in Sweden